The John J. Carroll Water Treatment Plant (CWTP) is a water treatment plant operated since 2005 by the Massachusetts Water Resources Authority (MWRA) to treat water bound for Greater Boston. The plant is located at the town lines of Marlborough, Northborough, and Southborough, Massachusetts.

History
CWTP is named after John J. Carroll, an original member of the Massachusetts Water Resources Authority (MWRA) board of directors. It was constructed from 1999 to 2005, and opened in July 2005. It replaced a prior facility only used for pH control. In addition to water treatment, CWTP has five concrete contact chambers capable of storing . Its construction budget was US$340 million.

Operation
Ultraviolet light treatment was added in April 2014. A 500 kW photovoltaic array is used to harness solar energy, reducing operational cost.

, water treatment performed at CWTP consists of:

Water for CWTP comes from the Wachusett Reservoir, primarily via the Cosgrove Tunnel, with the Wachusett Aqueduct as a standby backup. Treated water then flows towards Boston primarily via the MetroWest Water Supply Tunnel, with the Hultman Aqueduct as a secondary system. The Sudbury Aqueduct and Weston Aqueduct serve as emergency backups.

References

Further reading

External links
 

Water supply and sanitation in Massachusetts
Buildings and structures in Marlborough, Massachusetts